Vlčice may refer to places in the Czech Republic:

Vlčice (Jeseník District), a municipality and village in the Olomouc Region
Vlčice (Trutnov District), a municipality and village in the Hradec Králové Region
Vlčice, a village and part of Blovice in the Plzeň Region
Vlčice, a village and part of Střížovice (Jindřichův Hradec District) in the South Bohemian Region